Ihar Karpovich (born 2 August 1988, Belarus) is a retired Belarus footballer. His latest club was Granit Mikashevichi in 2013.

Honours
Sheriff Tiraspol
Moldovan National Division champion: 2008–09, 2009–10
Commonwealth of Independent States Cup winner: 2009

Naftan Novopolotsk
Belarusian Cup winner: 2011–12

External links

1988 births
Living people
Belarusian footballers
Association football defenders
Belarusian expatriate footballers
Expatriate footballers in Moldova
Belarusian expatriate sportspeople in Moldova
People from Lida
FC Lida players
FC Tiraspol players
FC Sheriff Tiraspol players
FC Partizan Minsk players
FC Naftan Novopolotsk players
FC Gorodeya players
FC Granit Mikashevichi players
Moldovan Super Liga players
Sportspeople from Grodno Region